Glen Hook (1 April 1917 – 8 November 1972) was a New Zealand cricketer. He played eight first-class matches for Auckland between 1935 and 1943.

See also
 List of Auckland representative cricketers

References

External links
 

1917 births
1972 deaths
New Zealand cricketers
Auckland cricketers
Cricketers from Auckland
New Zealand Army cricketers
North Island Army cricketers